Sarah Reid (born 20 August 1985 in Paisley, Scotland) is a Scottish curler from Glasgow.

She was alternate for the Scottish team at the 2010 Ford World Women's Curling Championship in Swift Current, Saskatchewan, Canada.

References

External links
 

1985 births
Living people
Competitors at the 2007 Winter Universiade
Curlers from Glasgow
Scottish female curlers
Sportspeople from Kilmarnock
Sportspeople from Paisley, Renfrewshire